The Moesa is a  river, a tributary of the Ticino, which flows through the Swiss cantons of Graubünden and Ticino.

It rises in Val Vignun near the San Bernardino Pass and descends, along with the A13 motorway, through the Val Mesolcina towards Roveredo, where it receives the rivers Calancasca and Traversagna. Near Arbedo-Castione the Moesa flows into the Ticino.

The Moesa is a popular river for kayaking.

Sources
This article originated as a translation of Moesa in the Italian Wikipedia.

External links
 Kayak pictures in Moesa river 

Rivers of Switzerland
Rivers of Ticino
Rivers of Graubünden
Mesocco
Soazza
Lostallo
Cama, Switzerland
Grono
Roveredo
San Vittore, Switzerland